Boğazkaya can refer to:

 Boğazkaya, Bayramören
 Boğazkaya, Haymana
 Boğazkaya, Kahta
 Boğazkaya, Mecitözü